Level Up! Inc., more commonly known by the trademark Level Up! Games, is a Philippine game publishing studio owned by Asiasoft since 2014.  According to their website, they currently have operations in the Philippines, Brazil and Latin America.

History

Level Up! Games was one of the first online game publishing companies in the Philippines. In 2002, Level Up! introduced Oz World, the very first massively multiplayer online game in the Philippines. The following year, Level Up! launched the first Massively Multiplayer Online Role Playing Game (MMORPG), Ragnarok Online. They followed up by introducing ROSE Online  and RF Online in the country.

In 2004, Level Up! partnered with Tectoy to expand into Brazil. In February 2005, Level Up! Games Brazil launched its first MMORPG in the country: a free version of the company's franchise Ragnarok Online, translated into Portuguese. This game was followed by numerous releases in Brazil over the next few years.

ePLDT, the digital entertainment division of the Philippine Long Distance Telephone Company (PLDT), acquired Level Up! Philippines in 2006, and merged their portfolios of online games. That same year, the first Level Up! Live event took place, with championship competitions held for four games: Ragnarok Online, Rose Online, RF Online, and Freestyle. Level Up! continued to publish new games, including Perfect World and Silkroad Online. They also had their first Level Up! School Tour, going as far north as Baguio and south to Davao City. The company expanded into India in the same year, partnering with Indiatimes to publish Ragnarok Online in the country.

In 2008, the Philippines was selected to be the host for the annual Ragnarok World Championship.

In 2010, the Level Up! Games Brazil expanded its partnership with Korean developer Nexon and brought to Brazil the first-person shooter Combat Arms. Also in 2010, a Level Up! Store was launched, featuring products related to games distributed by Level Up! Games Brazil. The Store was closed in June 2011. At the end of the year, the company launched the title Allods Online.

In October 2012, Level Up! Games merged with E-Games, creating the largest online game publishing operation in the Philippines. In the same year, Level Up! had 49% of its international shares bought by Tencent, China's leading internet service provider, for nearly 27 million dollars. Also in 2012, Level Up! Brazil released Turma do Chico Bento, their first game developed for social networking site, Facebook, at Level Up! Live 2012. Level Up! Games expanded into Latin America the same year.

Level Up! Games was acquired by Asiasoft for 2.9 million dollars in 2014. Since then, Level Up!'s portfolio has been published in Asia under PlayPark.

Games distributed by the company

Brazil

 9Dragons
 Aion: The Tower of Eternity
 Allods Online
 City of Heroes
 Combat Arms
 DarkEden
 DECO Online
 Dofus
 FunOrb
 Grand Chase
 Khan Wars
 Guild Wars
 Lineage II
 Lunia
 Pangya
 Perfect World
 Ragnarok Online
 RuneScape
 Silkroad Online
 Sudden Attack
 Trickster Online
 Turma do Chico Bento
 Warrior Epic
 Forsaken
 Eligium
 M.A.R.S.
 SMITE
 Elsword 
 Assault Fire (as 'Ni Zhan' in China)
 Warface
 GunZ: The Duel

India (Closed as of 2009)
 Freestyle
 World OZ
 Ragnarok Online 
 Gunz Online

Philippines
 Assault Fire
 Ragnarok
 Cabal
 K.O.S. Secret Operations 
 RAN Online
Perfect World

Current

 Perfect World
 Audition PH
 World In Audition
 Cabal Online
 Assault Fire (Ni Zhan in China)
 Special Force

Former
 Ragnarok Online local service was shut down on March 31, 2015. Players were then transferred to WarpPortal's international server in April 2015.
 Grand Chase (local server was shut down in November 2014)
 Eligium
 Rohan (getting close by October 2014)
 Flyff (Getting close by September 2014)
 Bounty Hounds Online
 Silkroad Online
 Oz World
 Crazy Kart
 Crazy Kart 2: Race Battle Online  
 Allods Online
 Band Master 
 Point Blank (transferred To Garena (2014))
 Pangya 
 K.O.S. Secret Operations (Sting: The Secret Operations)
 Freestyle Online (global servers were closed in 2010)
 RF Online 
 ROSE Online
 RAN Online

South East Asia (Thru Asiasoft | Playpark)
 Phantasy Star Online 2 (closed and never been able to move on Patch from Dark Flaz S2 patch)
 Football Club Manager/FCM
 Strife
 Maple Story
 DC Universe Online (Now on Open Beta)''
 Sudden Attack
 AVA
 Chaos Online
Dance Battle Audition (used to be available international, was changed and never informed players)

See also

References

External links
 Site of Brazil
 Site of the Philippines
 Site of India
 Site of Latin America
 Site Global
 Warning about the closing of Level Up! Store

Companies based in Makati
Video game companies established in 2002
Video game companies of the Philippines
Video game publishers
2002 establishments in the Philippines